Alejandría "Alex" Godínez Herrera (born 24 February 1994) is a Mexican footballer who plays as a goalkeeper for Liga MX Femenil club CF Monterrey and the Mexico women's national team.

International career
Godínez made her senior debut for Mexico on 1 March 2019 in a 2–1 victory over Thailand.

Notes

References

External links
 
 

1994 births
Living people
Mexican women's footballers
Footballers from Guanajuato
Women's association football goalkeepers
DePaul Blue Demons women's soccer players
Liga MX Femenil players
C.F. Pachuca (women) footballers
Mexico women's international footballers
Mexican emigrants to the United States
People with acquired American citizenship
American women's soccer players
Soccer players from Colorado
Sportspeople from Aurora, Colorado
American sportspeople of Mexican descent
21st-century American women
Mexican footballers